Smith's zokor (Eospalax smithii) is a species of rodent in the family Spalacidae, endemic to China.

References
 Smith, A.T. & Johnston, C.H. 2008.  Eospalax smithii.   2008 IUCN Red List of Threatened Species.   Downloaded on 14 August 2009.

Eospalax
Rodents of China
Mammals described in 1911
Taxa named by Oldfield Thomas
Taxonomy articles created by Polbot
Endemic fauna of China